Flavobacterium daemonensis is a Gram-negative, obligately aerobic and motile bacterium from the genus of Flavobacterium which has been isolated from soil from the Daemo Mountain in Korea.

References

daejeonense
Bacteria described in 2015